The Second Concerto for Orchestra is a concerto for orchestra by the American composer Steven Stucky.  The work was commissioned by the Los Angeles Philharmonic while Stucky was their composer-in-residence for the inaugural season of the Walt Disney Concert Hall.  It was completed in 2003 and was first performed on March 12, 2004, with the conductor Esa-Pekka Salonen leading the Los Angeles Philharmonic.  The piece was awarded the 2005 Pulitzer Prize for Music.

Composition

Background
Stucky conceived the piece as a celebration of his musical influences.  Thus, the work freely references passages from many previous classical works.  In 2003, Stucky elaborated:

Stucky also assigned letters of the alphabet to pitches in order to form a musical code in the first movement.  He wrote that the first movement "enshrines essential personal loyalties, using musical code to refer to the Los Angeles Philharmonic, my musical home for almost sixteen years, and to many of the people most important to me there."

Structure
The Second Concerto for Orchestra has a duration of approximately twenty-five minutes and is composed in three movements:
Overture (with Friends)
Variations
Finale

Instrumentation
The work is scored for three flutes (second doubling alto flute, third doubling piccolo, three oboes (third doubling English horn), three clarinets (third doubling bass clarinet), two bassoons, contrabassoon, four French horns, four trumpets, three trombones, tuba, timpani, percussion (anvil, bass drum, bongo drums, chimes, Chinese cymbal, glockenspiel, large triangle, Latin cowbells, marimba, snare drum, suspended cymbals, tambourine, tamtam, tom-toms, vibraphone, wood blocks, xylophone, whip), harp, piano, celesta, and strings.

Reception
Mark Swed of the Los Angeles Times called the concerto a "colorful, delight-bringing score" and praised the references to other classical works, commenting, "The strongest impression throughout the concerto — which has a richly expressive, exquisitely tinted variations movement in the center and a rollicking final movement — is of Stucky's sumptuous ease with the orchestra. He makes the transition from Ravel's sound world to Salonen's not only natural but fresh, the way new blooms always are. This is music of eternal springtime."  Reviewing the premiere recording by Lan Shui and the Singapore Symphony Orchestra, Richard Whitehouse of Gramophone praised Stucky's "fastidious orchestral sense" and added, "those looking for contemporary music that is approachable but never facile will find undoubted rewards here."

Discography
A recording of the Second Concerto for Orchestra performed by the National Orchestral Institute Philharmonic, conducted by David Alan Miller, was released June 2018 and was nominated for a Grammy Award in the field of "Best Orchestral Performance." An additional recording of the Second Concerto for Orchestra, performed by Evelyn Glennie and the Singapore Symphony Orchestra under conductor Lan Shui, was released April 27, 2010 through BIS Records and features Stucky's other orchestral works Spirit Voices and Pinturas de Tamayo.

References

Concertos by Steven Stucky
2003 compositions
Stucky 2
21st-century classical music
Pulitzer Prize for Music-winning works
Music commissioned by the Los Angeles Philharmonic